Liptena congoana is a butterfly in the family Lycaenidae. It is found in the Republic of the Congo, the Democratic Republic of the Congo (North Kivu) and Uganda.

References

Butterflies described in 1933
Liptena